José Fabián Albornoz (born 19 July 1970) is an Argentine former footballer who played as a midfielder.

Career
Born in Buenos Aires, Albornoz played for Talleres de Córdoba, San Lorenzo, Deportivo Español, River Plate, Racing, Gimnasia, Independiente, Newell's Old Boys, Unión Tarija, Olimpo and Belgrano.

He also earned three caps for Argentina in 1996, scoring one goal.

References

1970 births
Living people
Argentina international footballers
Talleres de Córdoba footballers
San Lorenzo de Almagro footballers
Deportivo Español footballers
Club Atlético River Plate footballers
Racing Club de Avellaneda footballers
Club de Gimnasia y Esgrima La Plata footballers
Club Atlético Independiente footballers
Newell's Old Boys footballers
Unión Tarija players
Olimpo footballers
Club Atlético Belgrano footballers
Argentine Primera División players
Bolivian Primera División players
Primera Nacional players
Association football midfielders
Argentine expatriate footballers
Argentine footballers
Argentine expatriate sportspeople in Bolivia
Expatriate footballers in Bolivia
Footballers from Buenos Aires